Mammillaria guillauminiana is a species of plant in the family Cactaceae.

Distribution
The cactus is endemic to northwestern Mexico, in Durango and Sinaloa states.

It was classified on the IUCN Red List as extinct in the wild until rediscovered in 2003. It has been reclassified by IUCN as a Data Deficient species.

References

guillauminiana
Cacti of Mexico
Endemic flora of Mexico
Flora of Durango
Flora of Sinaloa
Endangered biota of Mexico
Taxonomy articles created by Polbot